Events from the year 1980 in Kuwait.

Incumbents
Emir: Jaber Al-Ahmad Al-Jaber Al-Sabah
Prime Minister: Saad Al-Salim Al-Sabah

Births

 7 May - Hamad Al Harbi.
 9 June - Khaled Abd Al Kudos.
 10 July - Mohammad Al Buraiki.

Events

References

 
Kuwait
Kuwait
Years of the 20th century in Kuwait
1980s in Kuwait